"Hoodlum" is a 1997 single by Mobb Deep. The song also features Big Noyd and Rakim. It was featured on the Hoodlum soundtrack.

Track listing
Side A
"Hoodlum" (Main)
"Hoodlum" (Clean)

Side B
"Hoodlum" (Instrumental)
"Hoodlum" (Acapella)

Charts

1997 songs
Mobb Deep songs
Loud Records singles
Song recordings produced by Havoc (musician)
Songs written by Havoc (musician)
Songs written by Prodigy (rapper)